Serenius is a genus of crabs in the family Xanthidae, containing the following species:

 Serenius andamanicus Deb, 1985
 Serenius ceylonicus (Laurie, 1906)
 Serenius demani (Odhner, 1925)
 Serenius gemmula (Dana, 1852)
 Serenius kuekenthali (De Man, 1902)
 Serenius pilosus (A. Milne Edwards, 1867)

References

Xanthoidea